Chris Ketley (born 29 January 1985) is a British, London-based multi-instrumentalist, musical director, arranger, composer and producer.

He is most well known for being a pop session musician playing guitar and piano for multi-platinum selling British artist Ellie Goulding and has previously worked with a variety of bands and artists such as Bryan Ferry, Zendaya, Banks, The Rakes, Dua Lipa, Markus Feehily (Westlife), Martin Luke Brown, Betsy, DJ Fresh, Christophe Willem, Conor Maynard, Rumer and The X-Factor Australia, The Moons & The on Offs.

He has made TV appearances with CeeLo Green, Katherine Jenkins, Cher, Gary Barlow, Alfie Bow, Barry Manilow, Donny Osmond and LeAnn Rimes.

In addition to his live experience, Chris composes and produces music for placement on advertising campaigns, TV, short films and other bespoke media. His clients have included The BBC, 20th Century Fox, Biscuit Filmworks (Noam Murro), Pantene, Universal Music and Grey London.

Some of his live career highlights include a headline show at Madison Square Garden, The Pyramid Stage at Glastonbury Festival, Saturday Night Live, Jools Holland, Coachella Festival and a headline show at Red Rocks Amphitheatre.

Early career 
His career started in his late teens playing for UK bands such as The on Offs whilst touring the UK & Europe. By the age of 21 he was touring the world with UK post punk band The Rakes. By his mid-twenties Chris was playing with Ellie Goulding on some of the world's biggest stages, TV shows and open-air festivals the music industry has to offer.

Bryan Ferry at the Hollywood Bowl 
Chris composed orchestral arrangements for Bryan Ferry's headline show at the Hollywood Bowl on 26 August 2017. The full orchestra was conducted by Thomas Wilkins. Chris worked closely with Bryan and his team to compose 18 new scores for the concert for a full size Symphony Orchestra. He worked closely with Jessica Dannheisser who assisted in orchestrating.

String arrangement 
Chris has arranged, recorded and produced strings at Abbey Road Studios, Air Studios & British Grove Studios. His arrangements have been used live at the Royal Albert Hall, Hollywood Bowl & Carnegie Hall.

He arranged the strings and group vocals across multiple tracks on Ellie Goulding's album 'Delirium' in addition to live recordings and special acoustic releases of singles such as "Love Me like You Do", from the soundtrack for the film 'Fifty Shades of Grey'.

Royal wedding 
Chris Ketley accompanied Ellie Goulding when she was asked to sing at The Royal Wedding reception in 2011. The Duke of Cambridge and Duchess of Cambridge asked Ellie Goulding to sing her cover version of Elton John's "Your Song" for their first dance.

Live career

T.V. appearances

Discography

Awards 
His work on a piece of music called "Avail", which was used in an online advert to raise awareness about domestic violence, was awarded a Cannes Lions award in 2017. The piece of music was set to picture by Biscuit Filmworks production company, directed by Noam Murro, commissioned by Victim Support, choreographed by Sidi Larbi Cherkaoui.

The piece of music was co written by Chris Ketley, Joe Kearns and Ellie Goulding, arranged By Chris Ketley, and co-produced by Chris Ketley and Joe Kearns.

Endorsements 
 Gretsch Guitars
 Hofner Guitars
Blackstar Amplification

References

External links 
 
 Chris Ketley Latest News
 Soundcloud

1985 births
Living people
British session musicians
British male guitarists
21st-century British guitarists
21st-century British male musicians